Christy Hartburg is an actress and model who appeared in Russ Meyer's Supervixens (1975).  She is the actress who adorns the famous poster for that film.  She performed on several Bob Hope tours to Vietnam in the late sixties and early seventies.

She also performed under the alias Christina Cummings in several films and TV shows.

References

External links

American film actresses
Year of birth missing (living people)
Living people
21st-century American women